

Events 
March 17 – Anton Rubinstein is named first director of the Saint Petersburg Conservatory in Russia, which opens in September. Tchaikovsky is in the first incoming class.
March 24 – Fromental Halévy's funeral, in Paris, is attended by an estimated 15,000 people.
April 24 – A letter from Giuseppe Verdi is published in The Times of London complaining about the rejection of a work commissioned from him for the Great Exhibition.
May 17 – Teatro Comunale Florence inaugurated as an open-air amphitheatre, the Politeama Fiorentino Vittorio Emanuele, with a production of Donizetti's Lucia di Lammermoor.
May 21 – Edvard Grieg gives his first concert in his home town of Bergen, Norway.
August 4 – Louis-Albert Bourgault-Ducoudray wins the Prix de Rome in the Musical Composition category. Jules Massenet is one of the runners-up.
August 9 – The première of Hector Berlioz's opera Béatrice et Bénédict inaugurates the new Theater Baden-Baden.
November 2 – The overture to Die Meistersinger von Nürnberg by Richard Wagner is publicly performed in Leipzig, conducted by the composer.
November 10 (November 22 N.S.) – Giuseppe Verdi's opera La forza del destino is first performed, in the Bolshoi Kamenny Theatre of Saint Petersburg, Russia.
November 18 – Antonín Dvořák is a member of the orchestra at the opening of the Provisional Theater in Prague.
date unknown
Johannes Brahms and Johann Strauss II meet, at Baden-Baden.
Stephen Heller and Charles Hallé perform Mozart's E-flat concerto for two pianos at The Crystal Palace in London.
Ludwig von Köchel publishes Chonologisch-thematisches Verzeichnis sämtlicher Tonwerke Wolfgang Amadé Mozarts (Catalogue of Mozart's Works or "The Köchel Catalog").

Published popular music 

"Battle Cry of Freedom" – George Frederick Root
"The Battle Hymn of the Republic" – Julia Ward Howe, published in Atlantic Monthly (February 1).
"Here's Your Mule" – C. D. Benson
"Kingdom Coming" – Henry C. Work
"The Merry, Merry Month of May" – Stephen Foster
"We Are Coming, Father Abra'am, 300,000 More", a poem   by James S. Gibbons, set to music by eight different composers, including Stephen Foster.
 Tyneside Songs – Thomas Allan (publisher)

Classical music 
Alexander Borodin – Piano Quintet in C minor
Johannes Brahms - First two movements of the Cello Sonata No. 1
Emanuel Chabrier – Souvenirs de Brunehaut
Felix Draeseke – Fantasiestücke in Walzerform, opus 3: Nr. 1 in B; Nr. 2 in A-flat
Louis Moreau Gottschalk 
Union, Op.48
Home Sweet Home, Op.51
Le Papillon
Asger Hamerik – Quintet
Ferdinand Laub – Concert-Polonaise, Op.8
Karol Józef Lipiński – 2 Impromptus, Op.34 (published posthumously)
Franz Liszt – Phantasiestück über Motive aus 'Rienzi', S.439
Henry Charles Litolff – Scherzo, Op.115
Giacomo Meyerbeer – Fest-Ouvertüre im Marschstyl
Cesare Pugni – The Pharaoh's Daughter, ballet
Joachim Raff – Piano Quintet, Op. 107 in A minor
Napoleon Henri Reber – Piano Trio No.4 'Sérénade', Op.25
Camille Saint-Saëns – Mazurka No. 1 for piano in G minor, Opus 21
Henri Vieuxtemps – Violin Concerto No.5, Op.37
Henri Wieniawski 
Etudes-Caprices, Op.18
Fantaisie orientale, Op.24

Opera 
Julius Benedict – The Lily of Killarney
Hector Berlioz – Béatrice et Bénédict
Frederic Clay – Court and Cottage (libretto by Tom Taylor)
Charles Gounod – La reine de Saba
Franz von Suppé – Die Kartenschlägerin
Giuseppe Verdi – La forza del destino

Births 
January 29 – Frederick Delius, composer (d. 1934)
January 30 – Walter Damrosch, conductor (d. 1950)
February 13 – Karel Weis, composer (d. 1944)
February 17 – Edward German, composer (d. 1936)
March 21 – Elmer Samuel Hosmer, composer (d. 1945)
April 5 – Louis Ganne, conductor (died 1923)
May 2 – Maurice Emmanuel, composer (d. 1938)
June 3 – Joseph Humfrey Anger, composer (died 1913)
 June 27 – May Irwin, actress and singer (d. 1938)
 August 10 – Ernest Richard Kroeger, composer (died 1934)
August 11 – Carrie Jacobs-Bond, US songwriter (d. 1946)
August 22 – Claude Debussy, composer (d. 1918)
August 29 – Maurice Maeterlinck, lyricist (died 1949)
September 25 – Léon Boëllmann, composer and organist (d. 1897)
October 10 – Arthur De Greef, composer and pianist (d. 1940)
October 15 – Conrad Ansorge, composer (died 1930)
November 1 – Johan Wagenaar, organist and composer (d. 1941)
December 9 – Karel Kovařovic, composer (died 1920)
December 18 – Moriz Rosenthal, pianist (d. 1946)
December 23 – Hans Wessely, composer (died 1926)
date unknown – Marcelle Lender, French singer-dancer and entertainer (d. 1926)

Deaths 
February 5 – Ignaz Franz Castelli, dramatist and songwriter (b. 1780)
February 7 – František Škroup, composer (b. 1801)
February 16 – Leopold Schefer, composer and poet (b. 1784)
March 17 – Fromental Halévy, composer (b. 1799)
April 7 – Sydney Nelson, composer and arranger (born 1800)
May 21 – Edwin Pearce Christy, founder of Christy's Minstrels (b. 1815) (suicide)
May 23 – Friedrich Ruthardt, oboist and composer (b. 1800)
May 25 – Johann Nestroy, singer and actor (b. 1801)
July 2 – Charles Mayer, pianist and composer (b. 1799)
August 31 – Ignaz Assmayer, composer (b. 1790)
November 1 – Eleonora Zrza, Danish opera soprano (b. 1797)
December 24 – Joseph Funk, composer and music teacher (b. 1778)
date unknown
Joseph Fonclause, bow-maker (b. 1799)
Jon Eriksson Helland, Hardanger fiddle maker (b. 1790)
Luigi Piccioli, singer and music teacher (b. 1812)
Geltrude Righetti, operatic contralto (b. 1793)

References 

 
19th century in music
Music by year